Surjit Singh Barnala (21 October 1925 – 14 January 2017) was an Indian politician who served as the chief minister of Punjab state from 1985 to 1987. Following that he served as the governor of Tamil Nadu, Uttarakhand, Andhra Pradesh , lieuntant governer of Andaman and Nicobar Islands and a Union Minister on handling various portfolios.

Early life

Barnala was born in Begpur Village in  Ateli Tehsil, Haryana. Born of a well-to-do family (his father was a magistrate), Barnala passed law from Lucknow University in 1945. In Lucknow, he was involved in the Quit India Movement of 1942.  Subsequently, he practised law for some years, and became politically active in the late 1960s, rising through the ranks of Akali Dal. Though, he first stood for election in 1952 but lost by a meagre 4 votes.

Politics

Barnala's first ministerial assignment was in 1969 when he has sworn in as education minister in the Justice Gurnam Singh Government and was instrumental in setting up the Guru Nanak Dev University in Amritsar.

In 1977 he was elected to the Indian Parliament and was inducted in the Morarji Desai Cabinet as the agriculture minister at the time when the ministry included Irrigation Water Resources, Food, Environment and Forests, Consumer Affairs, Power and Chemical And Fertilizers and Rural Development. In 1978, Barnala signed the historic Ganga Waters Agreement (Farakka Agreement) with Bangladesh.

In 1979, during the turmoil in the national government when PM Morarji Desai resigned, the then-president Neelam Sanjiva Reddy toyed with the idea of appointing an interim government with Barnala as prime minister but had to drop the idea at the last moment, fearing horse-trading by a top member of the Cabinet, and Deputy Prime Minister Chaudhary Charan Singh assumed prime ministership.

Barnala served as chief minister of Punjab from 29 September 1985 until 11 May 1987. Barnala, a member of the Sikh political party Shiromani Akali Dal (Longowal), served as chief minister during a period of Sikh militant movement in Punjab. The state had under in Barnala's chief ministership from 1985 to 1987, and after nearly two years in office, President's Rule was imposed.
  
In 1996, Barnala once again came close to becoming prime minister as in the 1996 Indian general election,  with no political party getting a mandate, it was a good time for a regional party to have its prime minister. Regional parties accounted for about 80 MPs in the Lok Sabha. The Asom Gana Parishad of Prafulla Kumar Mahanta and Telugu Desam Party of Chandra Babu Naidu, including The Left parties, zeroed on Barnala, but at the last minute Barnala's parent party Shiromani Akali Dal led by Barnala's supposedly close friend Parkash Singh Badal without informing Barnala joined hands with the Bharatiya Janata Party hence Barnala yet again missed being Prime Minister.

In 1997, Barnala was a candidate of the BJP and its allies in the election of the vice-president of India.

In 1998, Barnala was again elected to Parliament and became the minister for Chemical & Fertilizers and Food & Consumer Affairs in the Vajpayee Cabinet.

At the time of his death, he was the patron of a four-party alliance Sanja Morcha in  Punjab. Like few other anti-Congress leaders of his time, he has spent about three and a half years in jail as a political prisoner, including 11 months in solitary confinement.

Governorship 

Since then, Barnala has served as a governor of several states. He first served as governor of Tamil Nadu from 1990 to 1991 for about nine months. Barnala refused to recommend the dismissal of the Tamil Nadu government, and when he was later transferred as governor of Bihar he chose to resign. He served as the lieutenant governor of Andaman and Nicobar Islands from December 1990 to 18 March 1993.

He was the first governor of Uttarakhand from its creation in 2000 until 2003, and governor of Andhra Pradesh from 2003 to 2004. During this time he also held additional charge of Orissa as governor for some time and was governor of Tamil Nadu until 31 August 2011 during his Tamil Nadu years. He also held additional charge of Puduchery for a few months. He is the second longest-serving governor in Indian history after Dr. A. R. Kidwai and the only governor to have served three terms in the history of Tamil Nadu State of 300 years.

Author and painter

In 1996, Barnala authored a book, Story of an Escape, about his experiences of living a disguised life in various locations of India. His other book released in December 2007 is titled My Other Two Daughters and has been transliterated in braille by Kunwar Singh Negi.

Barnala painted landscapes and political portraits, many of which are on display in the official residences he occupied in his various tenures. His paintings have also been sold in various fund raisers.

Personal life
Surjit Singh Barnala was married to Surjit Kaur Barnala, who is also an active politician. In August 2009, Surjit Kaur become the President of the Shiromani Akali Dal (Longowal). The couple had three sons and a daughter. The eldest son, Jasjit Barnala, is not actively involved in politics and is a businessman. Their second son, Gaganjit is a politician. His youngest son, NeilInder, died in a road accident in 1996 and daughter, Amrit, in 2012 of cancer. He has 8 grandchildren varying from 37 years to 17 years old.

Death

Barnala died at PGIMER hospital, Chandigarh, following a prolonged illness, on 14 January 2017, aged 91. He was admitted to the hospital on 12 January.

Notes

References

|-

|-

|-

|-

|-

|-

|-

|-

|-

|-

External links

 Biography on the Government of Tamil Nadu website
   From Politics to Painting
  CV of Barnala
 Prime Minister, Chief Minister and other Minister great Mr. Barnala  On his 86 bday

1925 births
2017 deaths
People from Barnala
University of Lucknow alumni
Chief Ministers of Punjab, India
Lieutenant governors of the Andaman and Nicobar Islands
Governors of Uttarakhand
Governors of Andhra Pradesh
Governors of Tamil Nadu
Agriculture Ministers of India
Members of the Cabinet of India
Indian Sikhs
Shiromani Akali Dal politicians
Punjabi people
People from Mahendragarh district
Punjab, India MLAs 1985–1990
India MPs 1957–1962
India MPs 1971–1977
India MPs 1977–1979
India MPs 1996–1997
India MPs 1998–1999
Lok Sabha members from Punjab, India
Indian vice-presidential candidates
Chief ministers from Shiromani Akali Dal
Indians imprisoned during the Emergency (India)